is a Japanese dentist, amateur astronomer and discoverer of 13 minor planets.

He lives in the city of Akō in the Hyōgo Prefecture, Japan, where his private Minami-Oda Observatory is located. At the observatory, he observes comets and minor planets using his home-made 0.20-m reflector telescope together with his wife Kumi and daughter Saki. Familiar with electronics and mechanics, he has also developed his own CCD instrumentation.

The asteroid 5591 Koyo, discovered by Japanese astronomer Takeshi Urata, was named in his honour.

References 
 

1959 births
Discoverers of asteroids

20th-century Japanese astronomers
Japanese dentists
Living people